Gooding County is a county located in the U.S. state of Idaho. As of the 2010 census, the population was 15,464. Its county seat is Gooding. The county was created by the Idaho Legislature on January 28, 1913, by a partition of Lincoln County. It is named for Frank R. Gooding, the 7th governor and a United States Senator from Idaho.

History
Almost 15,000 years ago, the Hagerman Valley was formed by the Bonneville Flood which deposited thousands of smooth boulders which can be seen on the surface of the valley floor today. After the Bonneville flood, Natives settled the area starting at least 12,000 years ago. Natives came into contact with emigrants on the Oregon Trail by 1840. The Oregon Trail traversed Gooding County with many emigrants stopping at Salmon Falls on the Snake River to barter fish with the native population. While Gooding County presently contains significant farming operations, it was the discovery of gold in 1862 that brought non-native settlement to the area. Mining settlement in the area was quite small in comparison to the rush to the Boise Valley occurring at the same time. The 1863 Census of Idaho Territory indicates there were 600 miners working Snake River mining operations, possibly covering the span of the river from the Hagerman Valley to Idaho Falls. Seven years later few people remained. A camp was sustained at Salmon Falls during 1870. The U.S. Census of 1870 enumerated 28 residents for "Overland Road and Snake River"

At the time of Snake River mining operations, the mining settlements were under the jurisdiction of Idaho County, Washington Territory. They were transferred to Boise County in 1863, becoming part of Alturas County at its creation in 1864. The railroad came through the area in the early 1880s with the Toponis railroad station being established by 1883. A post office was established there by 1887. The Toponis and Hagerman Valley settlements became part of Logan County at its creation in 1889. Logan county established the Bliss, Malad, and Toponis precincts containing 340 residents at the 1890 census. These precincts were transferred to Lincoln County at the first attempt to organize it in 1891. That act was found unconstitutional. In 1895 the precincts were transferred to Blaine County for a few days before ending up in Lincoln County. The arrival of the 20th Century brought a significant increase in settlement at Wendell and Toponis. Wendell incorporated in 1902. A town was platted on land owned by Frank R. Gooding at the Toponis rail station in 1907 and incorporated under the name of Gooding in 1908. The boom in settlement is clearly reflected when comparing 1900 and 1910 U.S. Census data. From 1900 to 1910, the Gooding precinct posted a 931% increase over the population listed for Toponis in 1900. The Clear Creek, Hagerman, and Wendell precincts were derived from the Malad precinct and posted a 509% increase over its 1900 population. Population growth was substantially lower at Bliss which only increased 42% over the 1900 population for the Bliss and Boulder Hill precincts. The only exception to the boom was for the sparsely populated Clover Creek precinct which saw a population decline. Overall, the precincts grew from 852 residents to 4,677 over that time frame—an increase of 448%.

Compared to other Lincoln County settlements of the time, Gooding's growth was mirrored in new settlement at Jerome and Rupert. The Jerome and Gooding precincts overtook the county seat of Shoshone as the most populous precincts at the 1910 census with the Rupert precinct trailing Shoshone by less than 200 residents. Shoshone was familiar with losing its position as county seat after having been established as the county seat of Logan County in 1889, only to lose that status to Bellevue at an election in 1890. The political considerations of Lincoln County's growth led to the creation of Gooding and Minidoka counties in 1913. Gooding County took on its present shape in 1919 after the formation of Jerome County.

Geography

Adjacent counties
 Elmore County - west
 Twin Falls County - south
 Jerome County - east
 Lincoln County - east
 Camas County - north

Highways
 Interstate 84
 US 26
 US 30
 SH-46

Demographics

2000 census
As of the census of 2000, there were 14,155 people, 5,046 households, and 3,718 families living in the county. The population density was 19 people per square mile (7/km2). There were 5,505 housing units at an average density of 8 per square mile (3/km2). The racial makeup of the county was 87.59% White, 0.23% Black or African American, 0.84% Native American, 0.23% Asian, 0.06% Pacific Islander, 8.24% from other races, and 2.80% from two or more races. 17.05% of the population were Hispanic or Latino of any race. 15.9% were of English, 13.7% German, 10.9% American and 6.6% Irish ancestry.

There were 5,046 households, out of which 36.10% had children under the age of 18 living with them, 61.90% were married couples living together, 7.60% had a female householder with no husband present, and 26.30% were non-families. 22.00% of all households were made up of individuals, and 11.50% had someone living alone who was 65 years of age or older. The average household size was 2.76 and the average family size was 3.22.

In the county, the population was spread out, with 29.60% under the age of 18, 8.70% from 18 to 24, 25.10% from 25 to 44, 21.20% from 45 to 64, and 15.40% who were 65 years of age or older. The median age was 35 years. For every 100 females there were 104.20 males. For every 100 females age 18 and over, there were 102.00 males.

The median income for a household in the county was $31,888, and the median income for a family was $36,290. Males had a median income of $25,321 versus $17,903 for females. The per capita income for the county was $14,612. About 11.20% of families and 13.80% of the population were below the poverty line, including 18.90% of those under age 18 and 11.30% of those age 65 or over.

2010 census
As of the 2010 United States Census, there were 15,464 people, 5,531 households, and 3,927 families living in the county. The racial makeup of the county was 80.7% white, 0.8% American Indian, 0.5% Asian, 0.2% black or African American, 0.1% Pacific islander, 15.3% from other races, and 2.4% from two or more races. Those of Hispanic or Latino origin made up 28.1% of the population. In terms of ancestry, 14.2% were German, 11.3% were Irish, 11.0% were English, and 5.6% were American.

Of the 5,531 households, 37.4% had children under the age of 18 living with them, 56.4% were married couples living together, 8.8% had a female householder with no husband present, 29.0% were non-families, and 24.2% of all households were made up of individuals. The average household size was 2.79 and the average family size was 3.32. The median age was 34.3 years.

The median income for a household in the county was $37,228 and the median income for a family was $45,369. Males had a median income of $31,752 versus $24,450 for females. The per capita income for the county was $17,694. About 11.1% of families and 16.5% of the population were below the poverty line, including 20.0% of those under age 18 and 19.2% of those age 65 or over.

2017
As of 2017 the largest self-reported ancestry groups in Gooding County, Idaho were:
 11.1% were English
 8.0% were German
 6.9% were Irish
 6.6% were American
 3.0% were Dutch
 1.5% were Norwegian
 1.4% were Swedish
 1.3% were Italian
 1.3% were Danish
 0.9% were Greek

Communities

Cities
Bliss
Gooding
Hagerman
Wendell

Politics

See also
National Register of Historic Places listings in Gooding County, Idaho
 County Parcel Map

References

 

 
1913 establishments in Idaho
Populated places established in 1913